Khu Mueang is a district (amphoe) in the northern part of Buriram province, northeastern Thailand.

Geography
Neighboring districts are (from the east clockwise) Khaen Dong, Satuek, Ban Dan, Mueang Buriram, Lam Plai Mat of Buriram Province, Lam Thamenchai, Mueang Yang of Nakhon Ratchasima province, Phutthaisong of Buriram Province and Chumphon Buri of Surin province.

Motto
The Khu Mueang District's motto is "Sugar factory, Luang U-dom shire, petrified wood and city of civilization."

History
The minor district (king amphoe) was created on 1 October 1969, when the three tambon Khu Mueang, Tum Yai, and Pa Khiap containing 58 villages were split off from Mueang Buriram district. It was upgraded to a full district on 21 August 1975.

Administration
The district is divided into seven sub-districts (tambons), which are further subdivided into 113 villages (mubans). There are two townships (thesaban tambons): Khu Meang covers parts of tambon Khu Mueang and Nong Khaman; Hin Lek Fai covers parts of tambon Hin Lek Fai and also parts of Khu Mueang. There are a further seven tambon administrative organizations (TAO).

References

External links
amphoe.com
 

Khu Mueang